Solonț is a commune in Bacău County, Western Moldavia, Romania. It is composed of three villages: Cucuieți, Sărata and Solonț.

References

Communes in Bacău County
Localities in Western Moldavia